Heinz Sommerhalder is a Swiss male curler and coach.

Record as a coach of national teams

References

External links

Living people
Swiss male curlers
Swiss curling coaches
Year of birth missing (living people)